East Bergish is a group of dialects of the Bergisches Land Region in western Germany. It combines features of the Westphalian group, the South Guelderish or Cleverlands group, and (predominantly) the Limburgish group, of which some of it is part of. South Guelderish covers much of the Lower Rhine area in Germany and extends into the Central Netherlands. It is a Low Franconian group, whereas Westphalian belongs to the Low German group.
It is also seen as part of the larger Meuse-Rhenish language group.
East Bergish is called  in German.

Some East Bergish dialects are Bergish dialects. They are seen as Rhinelandic by outsiders.

 Literature 
 Georg Wenker: Das rheinische Platt. 1877.
 Das rheinische Platt, (Sammlung deutsche Dialektgeographie Heft 8), Marburg, 1915.
 Georg Cornelissen, Peter Honnen, Fritz Langensiepen (editor): Das rheinische Platt. Eine Bestandsaufnahme. Handbuch der rheinischen Mundarten Teil 1: Texte. Rheinland-Verlag, Köln. 1989. 
 Julius Leithäuser: Wörterbuch der Barmer Mundarten nebst dem Abriß der Sprachlehre. [Wuppertal-] Elberfeld, 1929.
 Julius Leithäuser: Nachträge zum Barmer Wörterbuch''. Wuppertal-Elberfeld, 1936.

Languages of Germany
Low Franconian languages
German dialects
North Rhine-Westphalia